The Black Bass is a fishing video game franchise.

The Black Bass may also refer to:
 The Black Bass (1986 video game)
 The Black Bass (1988 video game)
 Black bass or Micropterus, a freshwater fish genus